The 2017 Segundona was the 23rd season of the second-tier football league in Angola. The season will run from 9 July to  October 2017.

The league comprises 2 series, one 4 and the other 5 teams, the winner of each series being automatically promoted to the 2018 Girabola while the runners-up of each group will contest for the third spot. At the end of the regular season, the three series winners will play a round-robin tournament to determine the league champion.

Stadia and locations

Draw

All teams in each group play in a double round robin system (home and away).

Zone A

Table and results

Match details

Round 1

Round 4

Round 2

Round 5

Round 3

Round 6

Zone B

Table and results

Match details

Round 1

Round 6

Round 2

Round 7

Round 3

Round 8

Round 4

Round 9

Round 5

Round 10

2018 Girabola playoff

2017 Segundona title match

See also
2017 Girabola

References

External links
Federação Angolana de Futebol

Segundona
Segundona
Angola